Peter Due (born 22 September 1947) is a Danish competitive sailor and Olympic medalist. He won a silver medal in the Tornado class at the 1980 Summer Olympics in Moscow  along with Per Kjærgaard Nielsen.

References

1947 births
Living people
Danish male sailors (sport)
Sailors at the 1976 Summer Olympics – Tornado
Sailors at the 1980 Summer Olympics – Tornado
Olympic sailors of Denmark
Olympic silver medalists for Denmark
Olympic medalists in sailing
Nordic Folkboat class sailors
Egå Sejlklub sailors

Medalists at the 1980 Summer Olympics